Sølver Hansen Laane (12 January 1788, Lardal – 12 October 1860) was a Norwegian politician.

He was elected to the Norwegian Parliament in 1842, representing the rural constituency of Jarlsberg og Laurvigs  Amt (today named Vestfold). He served only one term.

References

1788 births
1860 deaths
Members of the Storting
Vestfold politicians